Across the Nullarbor is a 1951 book by Ion Idriess. It was based on a trip he took across the Nullarbor Plain.

References

External links
Across the Nullarbor at AustLit

1951 non-fiction books
Nullarbor Plain
Australian non-fiction books
Books by Ion Idriess
Australian travel books
Angus & Robertson books